Paul S. Anderson (born February 3, 1938) is an American chemist. He worked at Merck, DuPont-Merck, and Bristol-Myers Squibb.

Early life and education
Paul S. Anderson was born February 3, 1938, in Concord, Vermont, and grew up in  Swanton, Vermont. He attended Highgate High School, then went on to attend the University of Vermont, receiving his B.S. in chemistry in 1959. He then studied at the University of New Hampshire, receiving his Ph.D. in chemistry in 1963. He briefly accepted a post-doctoral fellowship with Jerrold Meinwald at Cornell University.

Career
Anderson accepted a senior research position at the Merck, Sharp & Dohme Research Laboratories.

Awards
In 1995 he received the E. B. Hershberg Award from the American Chemical Society for his work on medicinally-active substances. Other significant awards include the Perkin Medal in 2002, the NAS Award for Chemistry in Service to Society in 2003 and the Priestley Medal in 2006.

He was the 1997 President of the American Chemical Society.

References

External links
 
 

Living people
21st-century American chemists
1938 births
Fellows of the American Chemical Society
University of Vermont alumni
University of New Hampshire alumni
Cornell University people